Events from the year 1940 in Sweden

Incumbents
 Monarch – Gustaf V
 Prime Minister – Per Albin Hansson

Events

April – Initiation of regular transit of German troops through Sweden to and from Norway
30 December – Victor Hasselblad forms the Victor Hasselblad AB Camera Company.

Births

22 January – Tobias Berggren, poet.
11 June – Gunnar Harding, poet.
18 October – Carl von Essen, fencer.

Deaths
10 March – Agnes von Krusenstjerna, writer (born 1894)
16 March – Selma Lagerlöf, writer (born 1858)
24 November – Janne Lundblad, horse rider (born 1877).
12 October – Ann-Margret Holmgren, feminist and pacifist writer (born 1850)

References

External links

 
Years of the 20th century in Sweden